The 2014–15 Butler Bulldogs men's basketball team represented Butler University in the 2014–15 NCAA Division I men's basketball season. Their head coach was Chris Holtmann, who took over as interim head coach after Brandon Miller requested and was granted a medical leave of absence from the university. Holtmann was then named the permanent head coach on January 2, 2015, becoming the 23rd head coach of Butler's men's basketball team. The Bulldogs played their home games at Hinkle Fieldhouse, which has a capacity of approximately 9,100. This was Butler's second season in the Big East Conference. They finished the season 23–11, 12–6 in Big East play to finish in a tie for second place. They lost in the quarterfinals of the Big East tournament to Xavier. The Bulldogs received an at-large bid to the NCAA tournament as a #6 seed and defeated Texas in the second round before losing in the Third Round to Notre Dame.

Previous season
The Bulldogs finished the 2013–14 season with a record of 14–17, 4–14 in Big East play to finish in ninth place. They lost in the first round of the Big East tournament to Seton Hall.

Off season

2014 recruiting class

Butler's 2014 spring recruiting run was able to stymie some of the postseason woes of 2013–14, with the entire freshman class save Andrew Chrabascz and walk-on Steven Bennett electing to transfer from the program along with Devontae Morgan from the sophomore class. The Bulldogs gained some considerable size in the front court this season, bringing in three freshman power forwards ranging from 6'6" to 6'8" and a small forward in Austin Etherington, a red-shirt junior transfer from Indiana who is immediately eligible to play. Another highlight of Butler's spring recruiting run was the addition of McDonald's All-American point guard Tyler Lewis, who elected to transfer from NC State and will sit out a year and start playing in the 2015–16 season per NCAA regulations.

Departures
After the previous season ended, four players announced that they would transfer. Sophomore guard Devontae Morgan, freshman forward Nolan Berry, freshman guard Elijah Brown, and freshman walk-on guard Michael Volovic announced their transfers at various times in the postseason.

Roster

Regular season

Schedule

|-
!colspan=12 style="background:#13294B; color:#FFFFFF;"| Exhibition

|-
!colspan=12 style="background:#13294B; color:#FFFFFF;"| Non-conference regular season

|-
!colspan=12 style="background:#13294B; color:#FFFFFF;"| Big East Conference Play

|-
!colspan=12 style="background:#13294B; color:#FFFFFF;"| Big East tournament

|-
!colspan=12 style="background:#13294B; color:#FFFFFF;"| NCAA tournament

Rankings

Awards

2014–15 Postseason 
As part of the Final Four weekend, on April 2 Alex Barlow represented Butler in the State Farm 2015 College Slam Dunk and 3-pt contest. After advancing past the first two rounds, Barlow met Kevin Pangos in the final round, just barely getting edged, 22-21. A sold out Hinkle Fieldhouse erupted in cheers for the graduating senior, a fan favorite. Another Butler senior, Kameron Woods, participated in the Reese's College All-Star Game on the East Team, joining five other Big East players on the roster. Although the East lost to the West 109-87, Woods dominated the glass, pulling down 14 rebounds - six more than any other player in the game.

References

Butler
Butler Bulldogs men's basketball seasons
Butler
Butler Bulldogs men's basketball team
Butler